Miriam Weiner is an American genealogist, author, and lecturer who specializes in the research of Jewish roots in Poland and the former Soviet Union. Weiner is considered to be one of the pioneers of contemporary Jewish genealogy through her work to open up archives and is described as a trail-blazing, highly respected guide and leading authority on archival holdings and resources in pre-war Belarus, Lithuania, Moldova, Poland, and Ukraine.

Early life 
Weiner was born in Los Angeles, California, to Edward and Helen Weiner. She grew up in Des Moines, Iowa.

In 1960, Weiner graduated from Theodore Roosevelt High School in Des Moines, Iowa. She attended the University of Oklahoma and Drake University in Des Moines, Iowa. In 1986, she received a B.A. in Historical Studies with a concentration in Modern Judaic History and Holocaust Studies from Empire State College, SUNY.

Career

Early career 
After attending college, Weiner moved to Southern California and worked for the Orange County Sheriff's Department in Santa Ana, California. During this time, she also took courses in criminal justice at Orange Coast College.

From 1969 to 1971, she was country singer Bobbie Gentry's assistant and road manager. She got the job by answering an advertisement in the newspaper.

Weiner worked as a paralegal for various attorneys in Beverly Hills, California. Weiner was then licensed as a private investigator by the State of California, which she said helped her later in her “next life” as a genealogist. Weiner moved to Northern California and lived on a horse ranch and worked as a real estate agent. In 1984, Weiner moved to Albany, New York, where her mother was born and many family members still lived, while she finished her college degree.

Genealogy 

In 1985, with the recommendation of Rabbi Malcolm H. Stern, genealogist for the American Jewish Archives in Cincinnati, Ohio, and Fellow of the American Society of Genealogists, Weiner became the first Jewish genealogist to be certified by the Board for Certification of Genealogists in Washington, D.C. As part of the ongoing certification process, the Board for Certification of Genealogists has required intensive review and continuing education, resulting in separate renewals (every 5 years) of Weiner's genealogical work over 30+ years.

From 1986 to 1988, Weiner was executive director of the American Gathering of Jewish Holocaust Survivors in New York City, which was founded by Benjamin Meed. Amongst her duties, Weiner helped develop the database of Holocaust survivors, now known as the Benjamin and Vladka Meed Registry of Holocaust Survivors, that is now housed at the United States Holocaust Memorial.

From 1987 to 1996, Weiner was a syndicated columnist, writing the column "Roots and Branches", which was published in more than 100 Jewish newspapers and periodicals, both domestically and internationally.

In 1988, inspired by reconnecting with her extended maternal family from Albany at a funeral, Weiner expanded the research of her family's roots with a renewed focus on Eastern Europe. This was before the 1991 dissolution of the Soviet Union, when it was virtually impossible to obtain access to archives for genealogical purposes in that part of the world. In 1989, as a result of the genealogy research and outreach from Weiner's syndicated column, "Roots and Branches", the Polish National Tourist Office (PNTO) extended an invitation for Weiner to visit Poland for the purpose of meeting with the head archivists and also to make plans for subsequent Jewish tour groups to visit their ancestral towns in Poland. Weiner found that the perception that Jewish documents were completely destroyed during World War II by the occupation of Nazi and Soviet governments was untrue. Weiner gained permission from the head archivist in Poland to create a town-by-town index to surviving Jewish and civil documents in archives throughout Poland. She did this with the official cooperation of the Polish State Archives.

Routes to Roots 
In 1990, Weiner founded the company, Routes to Roots, which offered archival research services to individuals throughout the world. Through Routes to Roots, Weiner organized customized tours to ancestral towns for individuals and groups interested in Poland and the former Soviet Union, including Ukraine, Moldova, Belarus, Lithuania, and Poland. Weiner undertook these tours of ancestral towns at a time when there was little to no technology, and difficulties specific to Jewish genealogy included the lack of surnames until the late 1700s, the fluidity of surnames due to immigration and language, and the destruction of documents during The Holocaust. Through Routes to Roots, Weiner has conducted genealogical research in the archives of Poland and the former Soviet Union.

Routes to Roots Foundation 
In 1994, Weiner founded the Routes to Roots Foundation, a nonprofit organization. The Routes to Roots Foundation hosts a website which includes a town-by-town index and inventory of surviving Jewish and civil documents held at archives and institutions in Eastern Europe, Israel and the United States Holocaust Memorial Museum in Washington, D.C. The website includes articles by archivists, historians and scholars; maps; document examples; name lists for about a dozen towns; as well as other reference material. Much of this information now available online was originally published in two books by the Routes to Roots Foundation, although the books include additional detailed content and images. As part of the activities of the Routes to Roots Foundation, Weiner donated copies of the books to the individual archives in Poland, Ukraine, and Moldova in appreciation of their assistance and as a way to improve the discoverability of their holdings relating to Jewish genealogical sources. Weiner also donated copies of the books to Jewish genealogical organizations.

Jewish Roots in Poland 

In 1997, in official cooperation with the Polish State Archives (Naczelna Dyrekcja Archiwów Państwowych in Warsaw, Poland), Weiner authored and published the book, Jewish Roots in Poland. The book includes archival holdings of the Polish State Archives, the Jewish Historical Institute in Warsaw, local town hall documents throughout Poland, Holocaust documents found in the archives of the death camps located in Auschwitz near Kraków and Majdanek near Lublin. The book also features document examples, maps, antique postcards depicting towns and daily life, and modern-day photographs. There are individual town listings for localities with more than 10,000 Jews in 1939.

Jewish Roots in Ukraine and Moldova 

In 1999, in official cooperation with the Ukraine State Archives (Ukraïnskyi derzhavnyi arkhiv) and the Moldova National Archives (Arhivă Naţională a Republicii Moldova), Weiner authored and published Jewish Roots in Ukraine and Moldova. The book includes archival holdings of the Ukraine State Archives and its branch archives throughout the country and the Moldova National Archives in Chișinău as well as local town hall documents throughout Ukraine and Moldova. The book also features document examples, maps, antique  postcards depicting towns and daily life, and modern-day photographs. There are individual town listings for localities throughout both countries.

Belarus and Lithuania 
The Routes to Roots Foundation website also includes articles by archivists and historians, maps and archive data from Belarus and Lithuania, presented in a similar format as Weiner's two books. Originally envisioned as a third book in the Jewish Roots series, this information is only found in this online format.

Routes to Roots Foundation Website Databases 
Archive Database

An online Archive Database containing detailed information about archives listed in Weiner's books on Poland, Ukraine, and Moldova was published in 2002 on the Routes to Roots Foundation website. The Archive Database was then supplemented with similar data from Belarus, Lithuania, and selected archives in Romania. The database continues to be updated by Weiner.

Image Database

A drop-down menu of 2,215 images (antique postcard views from the 1920s and before; Jewish cemetery photos, Holocaust memorials and other town views) of 358 towns in six countries in Eastern Europe.

Surname Databases

Standard Surname Search (surname lists, archive documents, books) and OCR Surname Search (telephone books and business directories).

Holocaust Lists

A new database which includes known Holocaust Collections from select towns in Belarus, Lithuania, Moldova, Poland and Ukraine. Choose the town from the drop-down menu. Typical entry example: Town: Pruzhany District (Belarus); documents in Brest Oblast Archives; entry: 1944-1945 (PARTIAL LISTS OF DISTRICT RESIDENTS SHOT OR HANGED BY THE GERMAN OCCUPIERS; LISTS OF PERSONS DEPORTED TO GERMANY). 

Maps

 JOG Maps (Joint Operations Graphic) - The JOG Maps are regional maps for cities, towns and villages throughout Belarus, Poland, Lithuania, Moldova and Ukraine. The original paper maps were scaled at 1:250,000 including names and details of even small villages, plus roads and railways, rivers and lakes, and wooded areas. Borders between administrative districts in effect at the time are also marked. Topography is indicated by color bands and contour lines.
 Soviet Town Plans - The Soviet Town Plans are full-color maps of selected major cities and towns in Belarus, Lithuania, Moldova, Poland, Romania and Ukraine, produced in the 1970s-80s. The maps are printed at 1:10,000 scale generally, clearly showing the footprints of individual buildings and other man-made and natural features, with topographic contours. Many maps include multiple sheets and full street name indexes. In Russian language and place name conventions.
 Individual Town & Region Maps - Individual Town & Region Maps are both black & white and color maps for major cities and smaller towns in Belarus, Lithuania, Moldova, Poland, Romania and Ukraine, produced primarily in the 1980s-2010. Many of these maps were produced by the local town architect; others came from various historians and archivists in the relevant countries.

Additional work 
Weiner is a former Advisory Board Member of the American Red Cross organization, Holocaust and War Victims Tracing and Information Center.  Weiner lectures and gives workshops and has presented her research at Jewish genealogy organizations and events, both domestically and internationally.

Legacy 
Weiner has been described as "the Indiana Jones of prewar Polish Jewry." Weiner has discovered previously unknown archival holdings and then had this information translated and made available to the public via her books and website; in so doing, she has been described as “The genealogist who lifted the archival iron curtain.”

Weiner was responsible for changing the perception that there were no Jewish ancestral documents available after The Holocaust. Because of her early travels to Eastern Europe, beginning in Poland in 1989 and Ukraine in 1990, and the time she spent in working in the archives there, Weiner was able to debunk the myth that existed at that time, an assumption that all Jewish documents were destroyed during the Holocaust. With her column “Roots and Branches” and along with her lecture schedule, she made this discovery available and accessible to Jews throughout the world. In addition to finding that documents had survived, Weiner organized the information, pre-internet, so that it was easier for genealogists researching their families to find information about archives, museums, and libraries with family documents. The original data in the archives needed to be translated, coded by document type and manually entered into an organized format. The result was the Archive Database created by Weiner, which then became available to the public in her two books and via the Routes to Roots Foundation website.

Donations of genealogical and archival material 
Weiner has donated collected materials and organized research to various archives, institutions and organizations. The items include books, maps, town brochures, video cassettes, archive inventories, and document copies.

 American Sephardi Federation
 Association of Holocaust Organizations
 Association of Jewish Libraries
 Center for Jewish History's Ackman & Ziff Family Genealogy Institute
 Center for Jewish History Collections
 Central State Historical Archives of Ukraine in Kyiv
 Chernivtsy Regional Welfare Fund in Chernivtsy, Ukraine
 Hebrew Immigrant Aid Society
 Jewish Genealogy Society of Greater Philadelphia
 JewishGen donation of extensive materials underway 
 JewishGen Bessarabia SIG Group
 JewishGen Belarus SIG Group
 Jewish Historical Institute, Warsaw, Poland 
 JRI-Poland
 Judaica Foundation – Center For Jewish Culture in Kraków, Poland
 Latvian State Historical Archives (Latvijas Valsts Vēstures Arhīvs) in Riga, Latvia
 Library of Congress
 Lithuanian State Archives (Lietuvos Archyvų Departamentas) in Vilnius, Lithuania
 Russian American Jewish Experience
 St. Louis County Library 
 Vernadsky National Library of Ukraine in Kiev, Ukraine
 Yeshiva University and Yeshiva University's Sephardic Reference Room
 YIVO Institute for Jewish Research

Partnership agreements 
In 2009, the Miriam Weiner Routes to Roots Foundation, Inc. and The Generations Network, Inc. aka Ancestry.com entered into a partnership agreement that granted Ancestry.com a semi-exclusive right and limited license to display the Archive Database and 1,200 images on the Ancestry.com website.

In April 2012, Weiner entered into a partnership with the Center for Jewish History in New York City, donating data from the Routes to Roots Foundation Eastern European Archival Database and Image Database for integration into the Center for Jewish History's online catalog. Weiner also became the Senior Advisor for Genealogy Services for the Ackman & Ziff Family Genealogy Institute at the Center for Jewish History.

In 2016, Weiner entered into partnerships with two JewishGen Special Interest Groups (SIGs) for Belarus and Bessarabia which involved the donation of research materials so it is available on each group's website.

Also in 2016, Weiner entered into an agreement with the Library of Congress where she donated 95 volumes of telephone books for cities, towns and villages in Belarus, Moldova and Ukraine. After the Library of Congress acquires digital rights from each country, the materials will be scanned and will be made available in a keyword searchable format on their website.

Additionally, in 2016, Weiner entered into a license agreement with JRI-Poland where Weiner and the Routes to Roots Foundation will contribute extensive archive data, articles, name lists, and other reference material to be processed by JRI-Poland and placed on its website.

In 2018, Weiner entered into a partnership agreement with JewishGen and the Museum of Jewish Heritage: A Living Memorial to the Holocaust  in New York City, wherein Weiner and the Routes to Roots Foundation will contribute extensive material from Ukraine, Moldova, Belarus and Lithuania including archive inventories, archive documents, articles, name lists, maps, images, and other reference material to be placed on the JewishGen website. Permissions have been obtained from Ukraine and Belarus resulting in more than 80 telephone books from these two countries now online at the Library of Congress website.

Personal life 
Since 1986, Weiner has been based out of Secaucus, New Jersey. She also has an apartment in Mohyliv-Podilskyi, in southern Ukraine,which she uses as a base to conduct research.

Weiner's family comes from Ukraine, Belarus, and Moldova. Her surname, Weiner, was originally Vinokur.

Awards 
 1988: Council of Genealogy Columnists, General Writing, Special Interest Writing Award
 1990: The Lidman Prize Competition, Writing Award for "A Window Into the Past" in Outlook (Honorable Mention)
 1991: Council of Genealogical Columnists, Writing Award
 1991: Federation of Genealogical Societies, Distinguished Work in Genealogy & History
 1991: National Genealogical Society, Individual Achievement
 1999: International Association of Jewish Genealogical Societies, Outstanding Contribution via Print Award: Miriam Weiner for Jewish Roots in Poland    
 1999: Jewish Book Council, National Jewish Book Award, Reference (Finalist) for Jewish Roots in Ukraine and Moldova
 2000: Neographics, Best of Category: Reference Books/Directories to Routes to Roots Foundation
 2000: Association of Jewish Libraries, AJL Research and Special Libraries Division Reference Award for Jewish Roots in Ukraine and Moldova
 2000: International Association of Jewish Genealogical Societies, Outstanding Contribution to Jewish Genealogy via Print for Jewish Roots in Ukraine and Moldova    
 2003: International Association of Jewish Genealogical Societies, Lifetime Achievement Award
 2015: Board for Certification of Genealogists, Awarded Emeritus status
 2017: Jewish Women's Archive Award, honored with Profile entry.
 2019: National Genealogical Society, honored with the President's Citation.
 2020: Federation of Genealogical Societies, honored with the Rabbi Malcolm H. Stern Humanitarian Award.

Works and publications 
 
 
 
 
 
 
  
 

Selected syndicated columns
 Weiner, Miriam, May 1987, Jewish Genealogy: Jewish Genealogy 'By The Book' 
 Weiner, Miriam, April 8, 1988, Yad Vashem Affirms Deaths
 Weiner, Miriam, May 1988, Digging Roots in a Dictionary 
 Weiner, Miriam, September 1987, Glasnost and Genealogy
 Weiner, Miriam, January 1989, Ships of our Ancestors
 Weiner, Miriam, April 30, 1993, Family Reunion: Planning Ahead or Standing in Line at the Deli
 Weiner, Miriam, August 4, 1988, Passing on a Legacy of Love to the Next Generation
 Weiner, Miriam, January 1991, Search Bureau for Missing Relatives
 Weiner, Miriam, June 29, 1990, Soviet Jews Search for Family in Israel
 Weiner, Miriam, November 1988, The Other Ellis Island
 Weiner, Miriam, May 1987, Jewish Genealogy "By the Book"
 
 
Weiner, Miriam, December 1988, Is This My Dad?

References

External links 

 Routes to Roots
 Routes to Roots Foundation
 The Miriam Weiner Genealogy Collection at YIVO Institute for Jewish Research
 The Miriam Weiner Genealogy Collection at Yeshiva University
 The Miriam Weiner Routes to Roots Collection at Jewish Gen 
 The Miriam Weiner Sephardic Genealogy Collection at Yeshiva University 
 The Miriam Weiner Genealogy Collection at the St. Louis County Library 
 The Miriam Weiner Ukraine Telephone Book Collection at the Library of Congress 
 The Miriam Weiner Genealogy Collection at JRI-Poland.org 

American genealogists
1942 births
Living people
Jewish genealogy
Jewish historians
People from Glendale, California
Jewish American journalists
Theodore Roosevelt High School (Iowa) alumni
Historians from California
21st-century American Jews